Sligo Rugby Football Club is a rugby union club based in Strandhill, County Sligo, Ireland, playing in Division 2B of the All-Ireland League.

Honours
Connacht Senior League (1): 2019-20
Connacht Senior Cup (3): 1913-14, 2017-18, 2019-20

External links

 Official site

Irish rugby union teams
Rugby clubs established in 1890
1890 establishments in Ireland
Rugby union clubs in County Sligo
Senior Irish rugby clubs (Connacht)